= Emmanuelle de Boysson =

French writer and literary critic

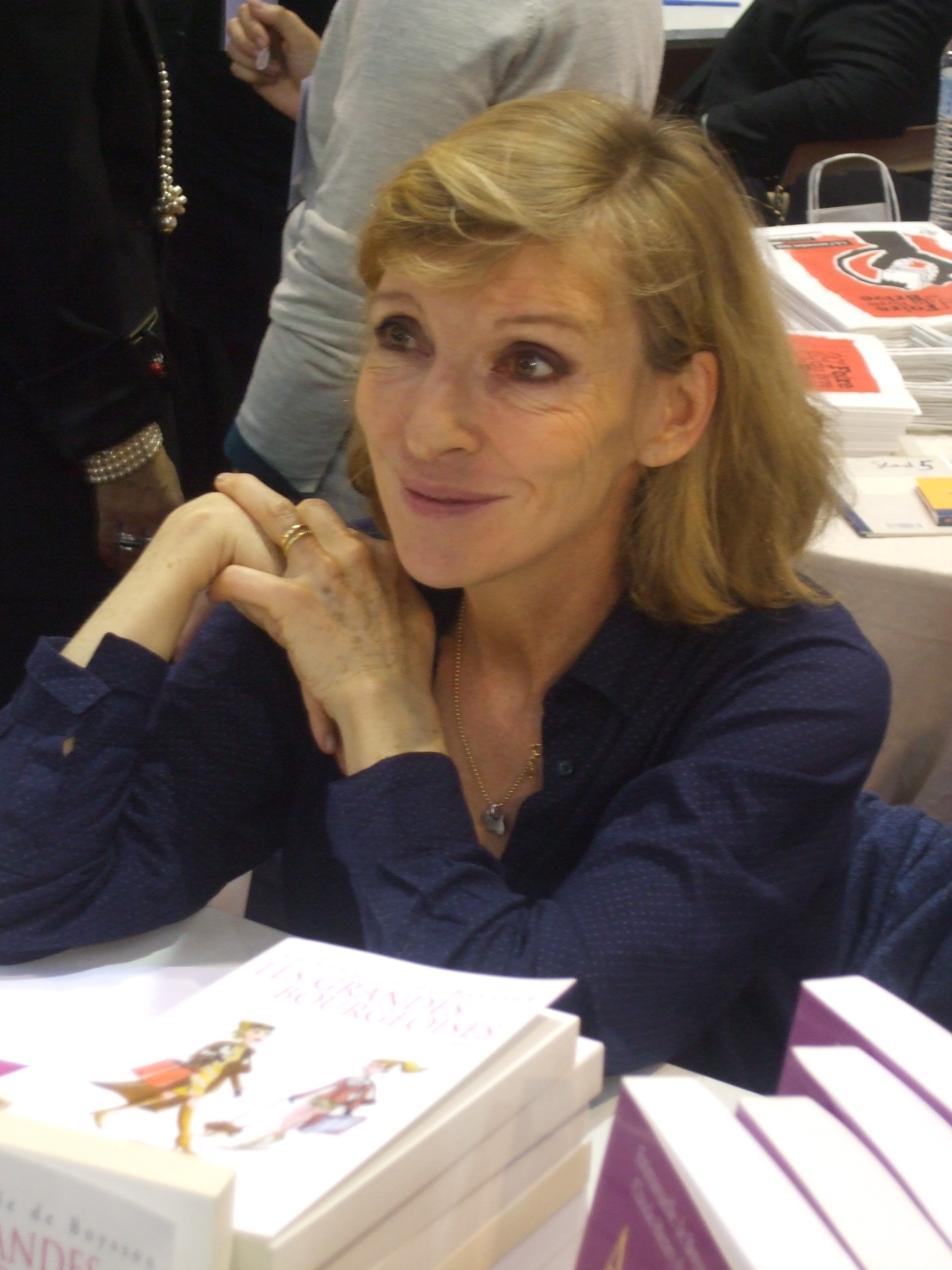
Boysson at Brive la Gaillarde book fair in France in 2010

Emmanuelle de Boysson is a French writer and literary critic. She is also one of the founders of the Closerie des Lias prize. She has published numerous essays and novels inspired by the women of Paris, including the bestselling Les Grandes bourgeoises (2006).
